The Latvian Chess Champsionship is the annual national chess tournament of Latvia among men and women players, which was established in 1924. It is organized by the Latvian Chess Federation, previously - Latvian Chess Union.

History

The first professional Latvian chess players can be traced back to the 19th century, when Latvia was a part of the Russian Empire. They participated in chess tournaments and union congresses, organized by the Riga Chess Association which was founded in 1890. After World War I and the Latvian War of Independence and the establishment of the Latvian Chess Union in 1924, the official Latvian chess championship tradition was started as the Latvian Chess Congresses. The first Latvian Chess Congress took place in 1924 in Riga. 

After the start of the Soviet occupation of Latvia the 1940 edition was not held, but in 1941 the first Chess Championship of the Latvian SSR was played. The tournament was also played once during the German occupation during WWII, in 1943. After the restoration of Latvian independence, the Latvian Championship returned in 1990.

The tournament has been mostly held in the capital Riga and the village of Mežezers of Pļaviņas Municipality in southern Vidzeme.

Championships and winners

{| class="sortable wikitable"
! Year !! City !! Men's Winner !! Women's Winner
|-
| 1924   || Riga       || Hermanis Matisons           ||
|-
| 1926-7 || Riga       || Fricis Apšenieks            ||
|-
| 1930-1 || Riga       || Vladimirs Petrovs           ||
|-
| 1932   || Jelgava    || Movsas Feigins              ||
|-
| 1934   || Riga       || Fricis Apšenieks            ||
|-
| 1935   || Riga       || Vladimirs Petrovs           ||
|-
| 1937   || Riga       || Vladimirs Petrovs           || Milda Lauberte
|-
| 1938-9 || Riga       || Vladimirs Petrovs           || Elise Vogel
|-
| 1941   || Riga       || Alexander Koblencs          || Marta Krūmiņa
|-
| 1943   || Riga       || Igors Ždanovs               || Milda Lauberte
|-
| 1944   || Udelnaya, Russian SFSR|| Voldemārs Mežgailis         ||
|-
| 1945   || Riga       || Alexander Koblencs          ||
|-
| 1946   || Riga       || Alexander Koblencs          ||
|-
| 1947   || Riga       || Zigfrīds Solmanis           ||
|-
| 1948   || Riga       || Augusts Strautmanis|| Milda Lauberte
|-
| 1949   || Riga       || Alexander Koblencs          || Milda Lauberte
|-
| 1950   || Riga       || Voldemārs Mežgailis         || Milda Lauberte
|-
| 1951   || Riga       || Mark Pasman                 || Milda Lauberte
|-
| 1952   || Riga       || Jānis Kļaviņš               || Milda Lauberte
|-
| 1953   || Riga       || Mikhail Tal                 || Milda Lauberte
|-
| 1954   || Riga       || Jānis Klovāns               || Milda Lauberte
|-
| 1955   || Riga       || Aivars Gipslis              || Milda Lauberte
|-
| 1956   || Riga       || Aivars Gipslis              || Milda Lauberte
|-
| 1957   || Riga       || Aivars Gipslis              || Milda Lauberte
|-
| 1958   || Riga       || Israel Zilber || Zara Nakhimovskaya
|-
| 1959   || Riga       || Kārlis Klāsups|| Zara Nakhimovskaya
|-
| 1960   || Riga       || Aivars Gipslis              || Milda Lauberte
|-
| 1961   || Riga       || Aivars Gipslis              || Zara Nakhimovskaya
|-
| 1962   || Riga       || Jānis Klovāns || Zara Nakhimovskaya
|-
| 1963   || Riga       || Aivars Gipslis              || Astra Klovāne
|-
| 1964   || Riga       || Aivars Gipslis              || Astra Klovāne
|-
| 1965   || Riga       || Mikhail Tal                 || Astra Klovāne
|-
| 1966   || Riga       || Aivars Gipslis              || Benita Vēja
|-
| 1967   || Riga       || Jānis Klovāns               || Vija Rožlapa
|-
| 1968   || Riga       || Jānis Klovāns               || Sarma Sedleniece
|-
| 1969   || Riga       || Anatolijs Šmits || Astra Klovāne
|-
| 1970   || Riga       || Jānis Klovāns               || Astra Klovāne
|-
| 1971   || Riga       || Jānis Klovāns               || Vija Rožlapa
|-
| 1972   || Riga       || Lev Gutman                  || Vija Rožlapa
|-
| 1973   || Daugavpils(M) Riga(W) || Alvis Vītoliņš || Tamāra VilerteIngrīda Priedīte
|-
| 1974   || Riga       || Juzefs PetkēvičsVladimir Kirpichnikov || Vija Rožlapa
|-
| 1975   || Riga       || Jānis KlovānsAnatolijs Šmits || Astra Goldmane
|-
| 1976   || Riga       || Alvis Vītoliņš  || Ilze Rubene
|-
| 1977   || Riga       || Alvis Vītoliņš  || Astra Klovāne
|-
| 1978   || Riga       || Alvis Vītoliņš  || Astra Klovāne
|-
| 1979   || Riga       || Jānis Klovāns   || Ingrīda Priedīte
|-
| 1980   || Riga       || Valerij Zhuravliov || Tatjana Voronova
|-
| 1981   || Riga       || Aleksander Wojtkiewicz || Astra Goldmane
|-
| 1982   || Riga (M), Jūrmala (W)       || Alvis Vītoliņš || Anda Šafranska
|-
| 1983   || Riga       || Alvis Vītoliņš || Astra Goldmane
|-
| 1984   || Riga       || Edvīns Ķeņģis || Anda Šafranska
|-
| 1985   || Riga       || Alvis VītoliņšJuzefs Petkēvičs || Tatjana Voronova
|-
| 1986   || Riga       || Jānis Klovāns || Tatjana Voronova
|-
| 1987   || Riga       || Edvīns Ķeņģis || Tatjana Voronova
|-
| 1988   || Riga       || Edvīns Ķeņģis || Natālija Jerjomina
|-
| 1989   || Riga       || Edvīns Ķeņģis || Ingūna Erneste
|-
| 1990   || Riga        || Edvīns Ķeņģis         || Anda Šafranska
|-
| 1991   || Riga        || Normunds Miezis     || Anda Šafranska
|-
| 1992   || Riga        ||  Valerij Zhuravliov       || Anna Hahn
|-
| 1993 || Riga  || Zigurds Lanka || Anda Šafranska
|-
| 1994 || Riga  || Valerij Zhuravliov || Anda Šafranska
|-
| 1995 || Riga  || Igors Rausis || Ilze Rubene
|-
| 1996 || Riga  || Daniel Fridman || Anda Šafranska
|-
| 1997 || Riga  || Edvīns Ķeņģis || Anda Šafranska
|-
| 1998 || Riga  || Māris Krakops || Dana Reizniece
|-
| 1999 || Riga  || Arturs Neikšāns || Dana Reizniece
|-
| 2000 || Riga  || Viesturs Meijers || Dana Reizniece
|-
| 2001 || Riga  || Guntars Antoms || Dana Reizniece
|-
| 2002 || Riga  || Ilmārs Starostīts || Ingūna Erneste
|-
| 2003   || Riga    || Evgeny Sveshnikov || Laura Rogule
|-
| 2004   || Riga    || Edvīns Ķeņģis    || Ilze Bērziņa
|-
| 2005   || Riga    || Edvīns Ķeņģis    || Laura Rogule
|-
| 2006   ||  Riga   || Normunds Miezis  || Laura Rogule
|-
| 2008   ||  Mežezers (Pļaviņas Municipality)   || Evgeny Sveshnikov  || Ilze Bērziņa
|-
| 2009   ||  Mežezers (Pļaviņas Municipality)   || Vitālijs Samoļins  || Laura Rogule
|-
| 2010   ||  Mežezers (Pļaviņas Municipality)   || Evgeny Sveshnikov  || Laura Rogule
|-
| 2011   ||  Mežezers (Pļaviņas Municipality)   || Arturs Neikšāns  || Laura Rogule
|-
| 2012   ||  Riga   || Vitālijs Samoļins  || Ilze Bērziņa
|-
| 2013   ||  Riga   || Igor Kovalenko  || Laura Rogule
|-
| 2014   ||  Riga   || Igor Kovalenko || Katrīna Šķiņķe
|-
| 2015   ||  Riga   || Arturs Neikšāns || Laura Rogule
|-
| 2016   ||  Riga   || Vladimirs Svešņikovs || Laura Rogule
|-
| 2017   ||  Riga   || Arturs Bernotas   || Linda Krūmiņa
|-
| 2018   ||  Riga   || Ņikita Meškovs    || Elizabete Limanovska
|-
| 2019   ||  Riga   || Arturs Neikšāns || Ilze Bērziņa
|-
| 2020   ||  Riga   || Zigurds Lanka || Laura Rogule
|-
| 2021   ||  Riga   || Rolands Bērziņš || Laura Rogule
|-
| 2022   ||  Riga   || Ilmārs Starostīts || Laura Rogule
|}

Multiple champions 
{| class="sortable wikitable"
! # !! Men's Winner !! Titles !! Years
|- 
| 1 ||Jānis Klovāns ||9 ||1954, 1962, 1967-68, 1970-71, 1975, 1979, 1986
|- 
| 2 ||Aivars Gipslis ||8 ||1955-57, 1960-61, 1963-64, 1966
|- 
| 3 ||Edvīns Ķeņģis ||8 ||1984, 1987-90, 1997, 2004-05
|- 
| 4 ||Alvis Vītoliņš ||7 ||1973, 1976-78, 1982-83, 1985
|- 
| 5 ||Vladimirs Petrovs ||4 ||1930, 1935, 1937, 1938
|- 
| 6 ||Aleksandrs Koblencs ||4 ||1941, 1945-46, 1949
|- 
| 7 ||Arturs Neikšāns ||4 ||1999, 2011, 2015, 2019
|-
| 8 ||Valerij Zhuravliov ||3 ||1980, 1992, 1994
|- 
| 9 ||Evgeny Sveshnikov ||3 ||2003, 2008, 2010
|- 
| 10 ||Fricis Apšenieks ||2 ||1927, 1934
|- 
| 11 ||Voldemārs Mežgailis ||2 ||1944, 1950
|- 
| 12 ||Mikhail Tal||2 ||1953, 1965
|- 
| 13 ||Anatolijs Šmits||2 ||1969, 1975
|- 
| 14 ||Juzefs Petkēvičs ||2 ||1974, 1985
|- 
| 15 ||Normunds Miezis ||2 ||1991, 2006
|- 
| 16 ||Vitālijs Samoļins ||2 ||2009, 2012
|- 
| 17 ||Igor Kovalenko ||2 ||2013-14
|- 
| 18 ||Zigurds Lanka ||2 ||1993, 2020
|-
| 19 ||Ilmārs Starostīts ||2 || 2002, 2022
|}

{| class="sortable wikitable"
! # !! Women's Winner !! Titles !! Years
|- 
| 1 ||Milda Lauberte ||13 ||1937, 1943, 1948-57, 1960
|- 
| 2 ||Laura Rogule ||12 ||2003, 2005-06, 2009-11, 2013, 2015-16, 2020-22
|- 
| 3 ||Anda Šafranska ||8 ||1982, 1984, 1990-91, 1993-94, 1996-97
|- 
| 4 ||Astra Klovāne ||7 ||1963-65, 1969-70, 1977-78
|- 
| 5 ||Zara Nakhimovskaya ||4 ||1958-59, 1961-62
|- 
| 6 ||Vija Rožlapa ||4 ||1967, 1971-72, 1974
|- 
| 7 ||Tatjana Voronova ||4 ||1980, 1985-87
|- 
| 8 ||Dana Reizniece||4 ||1998-2001
|- 
| 9 ||Ilze Bērziņa ||4 ||2004, 2008, 2012, 2019
|- 
| 10 ||Astra Goldmane ||3 ||1975, 1981, 1983
|- 
| 11 ||Ingrīda Priedīte ||2 ||1973, 1979
|- 
| 12 ||Ilze Rubene ||2 ||1976, 1995
|- 
| 13 ||Ingūna Erneste ||2 ||1989, 2002
|}

Notes

External links

 Latvian Chess Federation website (tournament 

  (results through 1985)
  chapter "Championships of Republics" (Latvian Championships results: 1941–1990)
  chapter "Turnīri - Latvijas čempionātu rezultāti" (Latvian Championships results: 1924–1993)
 
 
 
 
  (results through 1979)

Chess national championships
Women's chess national championships
Chess in Latvia
Chess
Recurring sporting events established in 1924